Albert II, Duke of Mecklenburg (c. 1318 – 18 February 1379) was a feudal lord in Northern Germany on the shores of the Baltic Sea. He reigned as the head of the House of Mecklenburg. His princely seat was located in Schwerin beginning in the 1350s.

Life
Albert was born in Schwerin as the second (but eldest surviving) son of Lord Henry II of Mecklenburg (c. 1266–1329), Lord of Stargard (Stari Gard), of the old Vendic princely clan of the Obotrites, and his second wife Princess Anna of Saxe-Wittenberg (d. 1327), of the princely Ascanian House.

Duke Albert succeeded his father as reigning Prince (or Lord) of Mecklenburg in 1329. He was also keenly interested in obtaining influence in Scandinavia, e.g. fiefs or income. The Holy Roman Emperor Sigismund elevated Mecklenburg to the status of a Duchy on 1 July 1347, through which Albert (together with his younger brother John) became the first Duke of Mecklenburg.

On 10 April 1336, Albert married a kinswoman, the Scandinavian heiress Euphemia of Sweden and Norway. Her father was Eric of Sweden, Duke of Södermanland and Halland, her mother was Princess Ingeborg of Norway, the heiress and the only legitimate daughter of King Haakon V of Norway. Through this marriage, Albert gained standing in Sweden by means of his wife's hereditary estates and ancestral connections. These enabled him to participate in the internal politics of Scandinavia. Albert acquired the nickname "The Fox of Mecklenburg" from the Swedes to evoke his scheming and avarice.

Albert arranged for his eldest son, the future Henry III of Mecklenburg, to marry Ingeborg, the eldest daughter and potential heiress of King Valdemar IV of Denmark.  Prince Henry married her some time around 1362, and their infant son was soon offered unsuccessfully as heir to the kingdom of Denmark in competition with Waldemar's youngest daughter, Queen Margaret of Norway, the future ruler of the Kalmar Union.

Albert's brother-in-law King Magnus IV of Sweden faced grave difficulties beginning in the 1350s. Influential nobles attempted to curb the concentration of royal power in Sweden and set up Magnus' own elder son Eric as a rival king. After young Eric's death, Albert's second son and namesake Albert became the next puppet claimant of the noble party in Sweden.

Duke Albert was deeply involved in trying to make his son king in Sweden, but with himself as the real power behind the throne. The younger Albert deposed his uncle Magnus IV from the Swedish throne and ascended as King Albert of Sweden.

Already in Albert and Euphemia's lifetime it was recognized that her genealogical position would become a pivotal point for any future claims to the Scandinavian thrones.

When his first wife died, Duke Albert married a second time to Countess Adelheid of Hohenstein, daughter of Count Ulrich of Hohenstein. That marriage apparently was childless.

Duke Albert had five surviving children born from his marriage with Euphemia: sons Henry, Albert and Magnus and daughters Ingeborg and Anna.

Ancestry 

1310s births
1379 deaths
Year of birth uncertain
Lords of Mecklenburg
Dukes of Mecklenburg-Schwerin
House of Mecklenburg-Schwerin
People from Schwerin